Jacob Melling (born 4 April 1995) is an Australian professional football (soccer) player who plays as a defensive midfielder for Charlestown Azzurri.

Biography
Melling attended Saint Paul's College, Gilles Plains. He was raised through the South Australian youth football setups of Modbury Jets and then the South Australian Sports Institute Football Program (SASI) before playing a key part in the South Australian side's championship win in the FFA State Institute Challenge in 2010. Melling was named Player of the Tournament, and was offered a scholarship to the Australian Institute of Sport Football Program where he then went on to form a mainstay in the heart of the Joeys midfield.

Adelaide United
On 18 March 2011, it was announced that Adelaide United had signed Melling on for his first professional club contract from the start of 2012.

Melling made his first team debut as a 78th minute substitution in the Round 14 match against Melbourne Heart.

On 15 March 2013, Melling was granted permission to be listed with two clubs so until the end of the end of the 2012–13 season Melling was listed with both Adelaide United and Para Hills Knights. He recorded 8 appearances with Para Hills Knights.

Melbourne City
On 20 May 2014 it was announced that Melling joined Melbourne City alongside two other youth players, Connor Chapman and James Brown.

Western Sydney Wanderers
On 12 August 2016, Melling joined Western Sydney Wanderers on a two-year deal together with teammate Jack Clisby. On 2 January 2018, he was released by Western Sydney Wanderers.

Central Coast Mariners
One day after leaving Western Sydney Wanderers, Melling joined Central Coast Mariners on a half-year deal. Melling was released by the Mariners in September 2020 at the end of the 2019–20 A-League.

Career statistics

References

External links
 FIFA profile page

1995 births
Living people
Soccer players from Adelaide
Association football midfielders
Australian Institute of Sport soccer players
Para Hills Knights players
Adelaide United FC players
Melbourne City FC players
Western Sydney Wanderers FC players
Central Coast Mariners FC players
National Premier Leagues players
A-League Men players
Australian soccer players